Brent John Arnel (born 3 January 1979 in Te Awamutu) is a cricketer who has played six tests for New Zealand. A fast bowler, he has represented Northern Districts and Wellington in a domestic career that began in 2006.

Early life
Arnel was born in Te Awamutu. According to his ESPNCricinfo player profile, "as a 10-year-old, Brent Arnel was kicked out of junior cricket because he bowled too fast". A promising junior cricketer, Arnel played club cricket in Hamilton with Fraser Tech, and after moving to Wellington he began playing for Onslow Cricket Club.

Domestic career
He made his first class debut for Northern Districts in 2006, playing against Canterbury. After a strong performance in the 2007–08 season in which he took the most wickets in the State Championship, he was selected for the New Zealand A tour to India.

Along with Seth Rance, he was the joint-highest wicket-taker in the 2016–17 Super Smash, with fifteen dismissals, whilst playing for the Wellington Firebirds

International career
In 2009, after success against the England Lions he was called into the New Zealand Test squad but did not end up playing. During the Bangladesh tour of New Zealand in 2009–10 he was again called up to cover an injured player, but was not selected to play. He finally made his Test debut against Australia at the Basin Reserve in Wellington on 19 March 2010.

References

External links
 
 ESPNCricinfo player profile

1979 births
Living people
People from Te Awamutu
University of Waikato alumni
New Zealand cricketers
New Zealand Test cricketers
Northern Districts cricketers
Wellington cricketers
Cricketers from Waikato